Queensville is a village within the Town of East Gwillimbury, Ontario, Canada.

History

Originally named Four Corners and Hackett's Corners (after William Hackett owner of a general store), it was renamed as Queensville in 1843 to honour Queen Victoria.

Overview

Among the private homes, the village proper contains the Queensville Cemetery, a post office, a United Church of Canada, and a complex containing a fire hall, a community centre, a public park with softball diamond, tennis courts and playground. Guy Paul Morin and Christine Jessop were neighbours in Queensville in 1984, and John Candy once owned a home approximately 1 km south of Queensville.

At one time, there were plans to build Ontario's first private university in Queensville.  The site for the proposed university would have been east of Leslie on the north side of Queensville side road.  It was expected that the university would occupy  and employ 1,000 people.

Queensville was home to the largest Antique Mall in York Region. The mall closed in the fall of 2019.

Geography 
Statistics Canada 2006 census population for all of East Gwillimbury 21,069.
Population approximately 3% of total East Gwillimbury population 632
Name of inhabitants: - Queensvillians

Surrounding communities 
Holland Landing, to the west
Keswick, to the north
Mount Albert, to the east
Sharon, to the south

References

See also 
 Royal eponyms in Canada

Communities in the Regional Municipality of York
East Gwillimbury